A directed infinity is a type of infinity in the complex plane that has a defined complex argument θ but an infinite absolute value r. For example, the limit of 1/x where x is a positive real number approaching zero is a directed infinity with argument 0; however, 1/0 is not a directed infinity, but a complex infinity. Some rules for manipulation of directed infinities (with all variables finite) are:

Here, sgn(z) =  is the complex signum function.

See also 
Point at infinity

References 

Infinity